George Dunlop may refer to:

George Dunlop (baseball) (1888–1971), American baseball infielder
George Dunlop (cricketer) (1846–1929), Scottish cricketer
George Dunlop (footballer) (born 1956), football goalkeeper
George Kelly Dunlop (1830–1888), missionary bishop

See also

George Dunlop Leslie (1835–1921), English painter